Ricardo Ehrlich (Montevideo, born 4 November 1948) is a Uruguayan biologist and a political figure.

Biography
From 2005 until 2010 he was Mayor (styled Intendente Municipal in Uruguayan vernacular Spanish) of Montevideo. He is from the prominent local Jewish community.

Ehrlich was a student militant who was jailed under the Presidency of Juan Maria Bordaberry who led a coup in 1973 to reinforce his rule at a time of great social tension. Subsequently, on his release in 1973, Ehrlich spent many years in exile in Europe.

By profession Ehrlich is a leading biochemist in Uruguay.

In 2005 Ehrlich stood for the leftist Frente Amplio in Montevideo's mayoral elections and won, gaining 60.9% of the vote. His nearest rival, for the Colorado Party, was Pedro Bordaberry, a son of former President Juan Maria Bordaberry, who scored 26.9%.

He was longlisted for the 2008 World Mayor award.

On March 1, 2010, new president José Mujica appointed him Minister of Education.

References

External links
CityMayors profile

Living people
1948 births
Education and Culture Ministers of Uruguay
Intendants of Montevideo
Broad Front (Uruguay) politicians
Jewish mayors
Politicians from Montevideo
20th-century Uruguayan engineers
Uruguayan people of Polish-Jewish descent
Jewish Uruguayan politicians